Robert Southwell may refer to:

Robert Southwell (lawyer) (c. 1506–1559), English civil servant, High Sheriff and MP for Kent
Robert Southwell (Jesuit) (c. 1561–1595), English Jesuit and poet, Catholic martyr
Robert Southwell (died 1598) (1563–1598), MP for Guildford
Robert Southwell (diplomat) (1635–1702), English diplomat, Secretary of State for Ireland and President of the Royal Society
Robert Henry Southwell (1745–1817), Irish MP for Downpatrick